Chloe Morgan may refer to:

 Chloe Morgan (General Hospital), a character on General Hospital
 Chloe Morgan (footballer), English footballer for Tottenham Hotspur F.C. Women